Our.News is a fact-checking platform that provides "nutritional labels" combining automated and user-assigned scores to rate the reliability of news articles.

The platform is available both as a browser extension for Google Chrome and Firefox, and mobile app for iOS. The Labels are aimed to combat online misinformation, providing a condensed breakdown of the background ingredients and information that make up any news article. This includes info about the publisher, author, editor, third party fact checks, article sources, AI article classifications, and public opinion ratings.

The company's "Nutrition Labels for News" products are also branded as Newstrition.

Richard Zack is the Founder and serves as chief executive officer. Neta Iser is a Cofounder and holds the position of Chief Data Scientist, and Jared McKiernan serves as Editor.

See also 
 Ad Fontes Media
 AllSides
 Media Bias/Fact Check
 NewsGuard
 NewsTrust

References

External links 
 Our.News
 Newstrition Chrome Extension
 Newstrition Firefox Extension
 Newstrition on the Apple App Store

Fact-checking websites
American news websites
American journalism organizations
Fake news
Google Chrome extensions
Nonfree Firefox WebExtensions
Internet properties established in 2016